Mattia de Rossi (14 January 1637 – 2 August 1695) was an Italian architect of the Baroque period, active mainly in Rome and surrounding towns.

Biography
Born in Rome to a family of architects and artisans, he rose to prominence under the mentorship of Gian Lorenzo Bernini, and even inherited the position as chief architect of the Fabbrica di San Pietro (Workshop of St. Peter's Basilica) in 1680 after the master died. In that post, he continued the work that had been started by Bernini on the outside colonnade and the Ponte Sant’Angelo.

He worked during a period with notable competitors, including the prolific Carlo Fontana. Among his works are the facades of the churches of Santa Galla and San Francesco a Ripa (built 1681–1701); finishing touches or reconstruction for Sant'Andrea al Quirinale, Santa Maria di Montesanto, and Santa Croce e San Bonaventura dei Lucchesi; the customs office in Ripa Grande; the Palazzo Muti Papazzurri (attributed, 1660); the tomb monument to Giovanna Garzoni in Santi Luca e Martina; the Mausoleum of Leo X; and the monument to Clement X in St. Peter's Basilica. This latter funereal monument was designed by de Rossi, but the sculptures were completed by Lazzaro Morelli, Ercole Ferrata and Giuseppe Mazzuoli.

He was Principe or director of the Accademia di San Luca in 1681 and 1690–1693, when replaced by Carlo Fontana

One new attribution is the design, perhaps along with Bernini, of the centralized church and complex of San Bonaventura at Monterano (1677), which, even in its present ruined state, recalls other mountain-top sanctuary churches in Italy. The buildings were commissioned by the Principe Don Angelo Altieri, nephew of Pope Clement X, who had just acquired the surrounding estate. It was for the Padri delle Scuole Pie, a group of priests engaged in education.

In 1683 de Rossi worked for Camillo Pamphilj in Valmontone, a little town not far from Rome. Here he planned the new main church, the Collegiata, or Church of Saint Mary, inspired by the church of Sant'Agnese in Agone by Borromini (Rome) and the Church of the Assunta in Ariccia, by Bernini.

In 1685 de' Rossi decorated on behalf of Cardinal Raimondo Capizucchi  the chapel of San Paolo in the church of Santa Maria in Campitelli.

References

 Italy cyberguide entry.
 Getty ULAN entry.
Bernini, Mattia de Rossi and the Church of S. Bonaventura at Monterano, by Hellmut Hager
Architectural History (1978) pages 68–78, 108–117.

1637 births
1695 deaths
Architects from Rome
Italian Baroque architects
17th-century Italian architects